Sandal and Agbrigg railway station serves the Wakefield suburbs of Sandal and Agbrigg in West Yorkshire, England. It lies on the Wakefield Line and is operated by Northern.

History

The station was opened in February 1866 as 'Sandal' and was on the West Riding and Grimsby Joint Railway which linked Wakefield with Doncaster. Approximately 1.3 miles south east of Sandal railway station in the village of Walton on the North Midland Railway line was another station called Sandal and Walton. Just south of the station there was a spur which linked the WR&GR line with the NMR line which crossed over Oakenshaw Lane. In 1923, the line became part of the London and North Eastern Railway before being absorbed into British Rail after nationalisation.

It was closed to passengers on 4 November 1957, but the route remained open.

The station was then reopened at the same site and renamed Sandal and Agbrigg on 30 November 1987 by the West Yorkshire Passenger Transport Executive, one of several closed stations in the West Yorkshire area to be reopened during the mid/late eighties and early nineties (other examples included ,  & ).

Facilities
The station has two wooden platforms with waiting shelters and digital CIS displays. It is unstaffed but has a self-service ticket machine, customer help points and automated announcements  provide train running information.  Step-free access on both sides is via ramps.

Services
On Mondays to Saturdays there is a half-hourly service to Wakefield Westgate and Leeds northbound and an hourly service to each of Doncaster and Sheffield southbound.

On Sundays, there is a similar service frequency in operation (hourly to both Doncaster and Sheffield, two per hour to Wakefield and Leeds) but starting later in the day.

References

External links

Railway stations in Wakefield
DfT Category F1 stations
Former West Riding and Grimsby Railway stations
Railway stations in Great Britain opened in 1866
Railway stations in Great Britain closed in 1957
Railway stations in Great Britain opened in 1987
Reopened railway stations in Great Britain
Northern franchise railway stations
1866 establishments in England